The 1987 Wyoming Cowboys football team represented the University of Wyoming in the 1987 NCAA Division I-A football season. It was the Cowboys' 92nd season and they competed as a member of the Western Athletic Conference (WAC). The team was led by head coach Paul Roach, in his first year, and played their home games at War Memorial Stadium in Laramie, Wyoming. They finished with a record of ten wins and three losses (10–3, 8–0 WAC), as WAC Champions and with a loss against Iowa in the Holiday Bowl. The Cowboys offense scored 426 points, while the defense allowed 271 points.

Schedule

Reference:

1988 NFL Draft
The following were selected in the 1988 NFL Draft.

References

Wyoming
Wyoming Cowboys football seasons
Western Athletic Conference football champion seasons
Wyoming Cowboys football